The Silver Bandit is a 1950 American musical Western film directed by Elmer Clifton and starring Spade Cooley, Bob Gilbert and Ginny Jackson. It was originally shot in 1947 on a budget of $30,000, but wasn't picked up for distribution for three years. It was the final film of the veteran director Elmer Clifton.

Cast
 Spade Cooley as Spade Cooley
 Bob Gilbert as Sam Morrell 
 Ginny Jackson as Molly Doren 
 Dick Elliott as Van Fleet Stooglehammer 
 Billy Dix as Sheriff Martin Lane
 Gene Gray as Gene Gray
 Clyde Jackman as Frank Doren
 Hugh Hooker as Deputy Hugh

References

Bibliography
 Pitts, Michael R. Astor Pictures: A Filmography and History of the Reissue King, 1933-1965 McFarland, 2019.

External links
 

1950 films
1950 Western (genre) films
1950s English-language films
American Western (genre) films
Films directed by Elmer Clifton
American black-and-white films
Astor Pictures films
1950s American films